National Highway 56, commonly referred to as NH 56, is a highway connecting the city of Chittaurgarh in Rajasthan to Dahod in Gujarat. The highway passes through the Madhya Pradesh.

References

External links 

 NH 56 on OpenStreetMap

National highways in India